Boxing at the 2006 Commonwealth Games was held at the Melbourne Exhibition Centre. It was one of the male-only sports at the Commonwealth Games, the other being Rugby Sevens.

Boxing medal count

Medalists

Results

Flyweight 51 kg

Semifinal Bout 194

Semifinal Bout 195

Gold Medal Bout 216

Featherweight 57 kg

Gold Medal Bout 217

Light Welterweight 64 kg

Gold Medal Bout 218

Middleweight 75 kg

Gold Medal Bout 219

Heavyweight 91 kg

Gold Medal Bout 220

Light Flyweight 48 kg

Gold Medal Bout 221

Bantamweight 54 kg

Gold Medal Bout 222

Lightweight 60 kg

Gold Medal Bout 223

Welterweight 69 kg

Gold Medal Bout 224

Light Heavyweight 81 kg

Gold Medal Bout 225

Super Heavyweight +91 kg

Gold Medal Bout 226

See also

 Boxing at the 1930 British Empire Games
 Boxing at the 1986 Commonwealth Games
 Boxing at the 1990 Commonwealth Games
 Boxing at the 2002 Commonwealth Games
 Boxing at the 2010 Commonwealth Games
 Boxing at the 2014 Commonwealth Games

References

 

2006 Commonwealth Games events
2006
Commonwealth Games
International boxing competitions hosted by Australia